Nanchan Temple Station, is a metro station of Line 1, Wuxi Metro. It is located near , a Buddhist temple. The station started operations on 1 July 2014.

Station Layout

Exits
There are 5 exits for this station.

Around the station
 Wuxi Mosque

References

Railway stations in Jiangsu
Wuxi Metro stations
Railway stations in China opened in 2014